Joe Watkins (October 24, 1900, New Orleans - September 13, 1969, New Orleans) was an American jazz drummer.

Watkins learned piano in his youth and began teaching himself to play drums late in his teens. Early in his career he worked with Kid Howard, Punch Miller, Herb Morand, and Isaiah Morgan. Starting in 1946 he worked with George Lewis, with whom he would play into the 1960s, including on recordings and international tours. Later, he recorded with Howard again and with Emanuel Sayles, though poor health forced him essentially into retirement in the mid-1960s.

References
Bill Russell, "Joe Watkins". The New Grove Dictionary of Jazz. 2nd edition, ed. Barry Kernfeld, 2004.

Further reading
T. Dash: "An Afternoon with Joe Watkins". Footnote 1 (1970), No. 4, p. 6, and no. 5, p. 4.
T. Stagg and C. Crump: New Orleans, the Revival: a Tape and Discography of Negro Traditional Jazz Recorded in New Orleans or by New Orleans Bands, 1937–1972. London, 1973.

American jazz drummers
Jazz musicians from New Orleans
1900 births
1969 deaths
20th-century American drummers
American male drummers
20th-century American male musicians
American male jazz musicians